A drawbar is a defensive implement used to secure a door or gate in a medieval building such as a castle.

When drawn across the full length of the door, it prevents the door or gate from being opened. To open the door or gate, the drawbar is pushed into a drawbar slot in the wall. These drawbar slots often survive in ruins and preserved buildings from that time.

The use of gunpowder and the possibility to blow up the door rendered them obsolete.

Gallery

References

Castles
Castle architecture
Fortification (architectural elements)